Retinoid X receptor alpha (RXR-alpha), also known as NR2B1 (nuclear receptor subfamily 2, group B, member 1) is a nuclear receptor that in humans is encoded by the RXRA gene.

Function 
Retinoid X receptors (RXRs) and retinoic acid receptors (RARs), are nuclear receptors that mediate the biological effects of retinoids by their involvement in retinoic acid-mediated gene activation. These receptors exert their action by binding, as homodimers or heterodimers, to specific sequences in the promoters of target genes and regulating their transcription. The protein encoded by this gene is a member of the steroid and thyroid hormone receptor superfamily of transcription factors. In the absence of ligand, the RXR-RAR heterodimers associate with a multiprotein complex containing transcription corepressors that induce histone deacetylation, chromatin condensation and transcriptional suppression. On ligand binding, the corepressors dissociate from the receptors and associate with the coactivators leading to transcriptional activation. The RXRA/PPARA heterodimer is required for PPARA transcriptional activity on fatty acid oxidation genes such as ACOX1 and the cytochrome P450 system genes.

Interactive pathway map

Interactions 
Retinoid X receptor alpha has been shown to interact with:

 BCL3,
 BRD8,
 CLOCK,
 FXR
 IGFBP3,
 ITGB3BP,
 LXR-β,
 MyoD,
 NCOA6,
 NFKBIB,
 NPAS2,
 NRIP1,
 NR4A1,
 NCOA2,
 NCOA3,
 POU2F1,
 PPARGC1A,
 PPAR-γ,
 RNF8,
 RAR-α,
 SHP,
 TADA3L,
 TBP,
 TRIM24,
 TR-β, and 
 VDR.

See also 
 Retinoid X receptor

References

Further reading

External links 
 

Intracellular receptors
Transcription factors